Bow Bow is a 2019 Tamil-language film directed by Pradeep Kilikar, who previously worked as an assistant director for Azhagesan. The film stars Master Ahaan and a Labrador and the plot revolves around their relationship.

Cast 

 Master Ahaan as Sanju
 Labrador as Rover
 Beagle as Lucky
 Indie (Stray) as Sultan
 V. Shiva
 Tejaswi
 Shrujai
 Sathyan
 Arokiyaraj
 Naanjil V. Rambabu
 Master P. Ravin
 Thiruppur Raj
 Charmila
 Jain
 Vijayalakshmi
 Lakshmi Priya Mathivaanan

Production 
Master Ahaan, from Bangalore, was cast by the director, Kilikar, felt that he "wanted someone who is fun and chirpy". Ahaan's picture was shown to him by the cinematographer. The film was shot in Chennai and Coimabatore. Bow Bow features 10 dogs, 3 of which play significant roles. Regarding the casting of Ahaan and the dogs, the director said that he "could only shoot when the dogs and the kid were in the mood to work". The film was shot in a little over a month and had dog trainers to train the dogs to show emotions. The whole unit had to work around this, but they were very cooperative. The film will release in six languages: Bengali, Hindi, Kannada, Malayalam, Tamil, and Telugu. Scenes that involved number boards and plates were re-shot to suit nativity and scenes involving dialogues were rerecorded.

Release 
The Tamil version released in October 2019 to mixed reviews. The Times of India gave the film two out of five stars stating that "Though the scenes between Ahaan and the dog are decently portrayed, with cinematography and music aiding it, the dearth of appealing sequences makes it a tedious watch". Cinema Express's review noted "dog films have the power to make even the stone-hearted turn into bawling babies but Bow Bow just leaves you with a migraine".

References 

Films about dogs
2010s Tamil-language films
2019 films
Films about animals
Indian children's films